First Church of Christ, Scientist, located at 809 South Flagler Drive in West Palm Beach, Florida, is an historic structure that on December 3, 1998, was determined to be eligible for listing on the National Register of Historic Places. However, the owner objected to the property being listed on the Register. It is still a functioning Christian Science church.

National register listing 
 First Church of Christ Scientist ** (added 1998 - Building - #98001519)
 Also known as PB681
 809 S. Flagler Dr., West Palm Beach
 Historic Significance: 	Architecture/Engineering
 Architect, builder, or engineer: 	Blandford, F.W., Trumbauer, Horace
 Architectural Style: 	Classical Revival
 Area of Significance: 	Architecture
 Period of Significance: 	1925-1949
 Owner: 	Private
 Historic Function: 	Religion
 Historic Sub-function: 	Religious Structure
 Current Function: 	Religion
 Current Sub-function: 	Religious Structure

See also 
 List of Registered Historic Places in Palm Beach County, Florida
 First Church of Christ, Scientist (disambiguation)
 Julian Abele, Architectural Engineer

References

External links 

 National Register listings for Palm Beach County

National Register of Historic Places in Palm Beach County, Florida
Churches on the National Register of Historic Places in Florida
Buildings and structures in West Palm Beach, Florida
Christian Science churches in Florida
Churches in Palm Beach County, Florida
1928 establishments in Florida
Churches completed in 1928